Zahra Ouaziz (born December 20, 1969 in Oulmes) is a retired Moroccan long-distance runner. She was the African record holder at 3000 metres and 5000 metres.

Career
Ouaziz broke the 5000 metres African Record in 1998, timing 14:40.19. The record was beaten in September 2000 by Leah Malot of Kenya, the new record was 14:39.83.

Ouaziz found much of her success on the track, but she also won two silver medals at the IAAF World Cross Country Championships and she was the winner of the 1999 Cross Internacional de Itálica.

Personal bests
1500 metres - 4:00.60 (1998)
3000 metres - 8:26.48 (1999)
5000 metres - 14:32.08 (1998)
10,000 metres - 34:04.64 (1994)

Achievements

References

External links

1969 births
Living people
Moroccan female middle-distance runners
Athletes (track and field) at the 1996 Summer Olympics
Olympic athletes of Morocco
People from Oulmes, Morocco
World Athletics Championships medalists
Moroccan female long-distance runners
Mediterranean Games bronze medalists for Morocco
Mediterranean Games medalists in athletics
Athletes (track and field) at the 1997 Mediterranean Games
20th-century Moroccan women
21st-century Moroccan women